The Eleventh Seimas of Lithuania was a parliament (Seimas) elected in Lithuania. Elections took place on 14 October 2012, with the run-off on 28 October. The Seimas commenced its work on 17 November 2012 and served a four-year term, with the last session taking place on 10 November 2016.

Elections

In the elections in 2012, 70 members of the parliament were elected on proportional party lists and 71 in single member constituencies. Elections took place on 14 October 2012. Run-off elections were held on 28 October in the single-seat constituencies where no candidate secured a seat in the first round.

Activities

Social Democrats have been the largest party in the Eleventh Seimas and form a coalition government with the Labour Party and the Order and Justice party. Electoral Action of Poles in Lithuania was initially a member of the ruling coalition, but left in 2014.

Vydas Gedvilas of the Labour Party was elected as the Speaker of the Seimas during the first session. He resigned less than a year later and was replaced by Loreta Graužinienė for the rest of the term.

This parliament led to the adoption of the euro and introduced direct mayoral elections.

Composition

Parliamentary groups

After the elections, the parliamentary groups were formed in the Seimas, largely on the party lines: Social Democratic Party of Lithuania (LSDPF), Labour Party (DPF), Liberal Movement (LSF), Order and Justice (FTT), Electoral Action of the Poles in Lithuania (LLRAF), Homeland Union - Lithuanian Christian Democrats (TSLKDF), Way of Courage (FDK) and the Mixed Group of Members of the Seimas (MSNG).''

By the end of the term of the Seimas, the following parliamentary groups were active.

Members
155 members have served on the Eleventh Seimas. After the resignation of Vytautas Gapšys, Aurimas Truncė qualified for a Seimas seat through the electoral list of the Labour Party but relinquished the seat before taking oath.

References

Legal history of Lithuania
21st century in Lithuania
11